HMCS Huron was an  that served with the Canadian Forces from 16 December 1972 to 23 October 2000. It served mainly on the western coast of Canada. After decommissioning, its hull was stripped to be used in a live-fire exercise. The ship's hulk was eventually sunk by gunfire from its twin ship, . Huron was the second ship of its class and the second vessel to use the designation .

History
Huron was laid down on 1 June 1969 by the builder Marine Industries of Sorel, Quebec, and was launched on 9 April 1971. It was officially commissioned into the Canadian Forces on 16 December 1972 and carried the pennant number 281.

Huron began a refit known as the Tribal Class Update and Modernization Project (TRUMP) in July 1993, performed by MIL-Davie Shipbuilding at Lauzon, Quebec and concluded on November 25th, 1994. At this time, its classification changed from Destroyer Helicopter (DDH) to Destroyer Guided Missile (DDG).

The ship was assigned to Maritime Forces Pacific (MARPAC) and was homeported at Canadian Forces Base Esquimalt.

Service
Huron served on MARPAC missions protecting Canada's sovereignty in the Pacific Ocean and enforced Canadian laws in its territorial sea and Exclusive Economic Zone. Huron was also deployed on missions throughout the Pacific and to the Indian Ocean; specifically the Persian Gulf and Arabian Sea on anti-terrorism operations.

As part of Silver Jubilee of Elizabeth II, Huron represented Canada in the naval review at Spithead on 28 June 1977. On 12 March 1980, it assisted the crew of the damaged freighter Maurice Desgagnes eventually taking them off when the ship sank.

From 19 February to 24 February 1981, Huron was used to carry out trials of the Sea Sparrow system to be added in the TRUMP refit. Later that year it carried the Governor-General Edward Schreyer on a tour of Scandinavian ports.

Huron was sent to the Persian Gulf in the winter of 1991 as part of Operation Friction, the Canadian Forces' contribution to Operation Desert Storm (the Gulf War), to replace its twin ship  as flagship of the Canadian Naval Task Group. Huron arrived after hostilities had ceased and patrolled for several months before returning to Esquimalt.

In 1993 Huron was deployed to the Adriatic Sea as part of Operation Sharp Guard in support of the United Nations naval embargo of the former Yugoslavia. It then departed for the refit that began in July of that year. After completing her TRUMP refit, Huron returned to the west coast in 1995, taking part in most of the major naval exercises in the Pacific Ocean. On 7 September 1999, with Royal Canadian Mounted Police and personnel from Immigration Canada aboard, the warship intercepted a vessel carrying 146 Chinese migrants. The migrant ship was found to be unfit and Huron transported the passengers to Esquimalt.

Huron appeared in the episode "The Devil and the Deep Blue Sea" of the television series Seven Days, representing a new type of US warship under the command of a female captain.

Paying off and sinking
Despite Huron being the most recently refitted Iroquois-class destroyer, it was placed in mothballed status in 2000, due to a personnel shortage following defence cutbacks during the late 1990s. In 2005 it was paid off from the Canadian Forces and awaited disposal at Esquimalt.

In 2006 MARPAC decided to use Huron in what would become the first sink-exercise that Maritime Command (MARCOM) conducted. The exercise was named Operation Trident Fury and was planned to use a variety of MARPAC ships, and US Navy and AIRCOM aircraft, to bombard Huron with artillery, missiles and strafing fire, and finally to sink it with a torpedo launched from a submarine.

Huron was stripped of armaments and all environmentally harmful contaminant equipment and fuel in the winter of 2006–2007. On 14 May 2007 it was towed to the MARPAC offshore weapons range west of Vancouver Island. The main gun used by Algonquin had originally been installed on Huron, meaning that Huron was eventually sunk by one of its own weapons. This was the first operational sinking of a Canadian warship in home waters.

The sinking was the subject of a 2007 History Television documentary, "Sinking a Destroyer".

Ship's bell
The Christening Bells Project at CFB Esquimalt's Naval and Military Museum includes information from the ship's bell of HMCS Huron, which was used for baptism of babies on board ship from 1973 to 1997. The bell is currently held by the museum in Esquimalt.

References

Citations

Sources

External links

Cold War destroyers of Canada
Iroquois-class destroyers
Shipwrecks of the British Columbia coast
1971 ships
Ships sunk as targets
Ships built in Quebec